Robert Summers (1922–2012) was an American economist.

Robert Summers may also refer to:

 Robert Summers (artist) (born 1940), American artist most known for his sculptures
 Robert S. Summers (1933–2019), American academic

See also
 Robert Sommers (1911–2000), British Columbia politician
 Robert Sommers (Medal of Honor) (1837–1919), American Civil War sailor